A total solar eclipse occurred on November 1, 1948. A solar eclipse occurs when the Moon passes between Earth and the Sun, thereby totally or partly obscuring the image of the Sun for a viewer on Earth. A total solar eclipse occurs when the Moon's apparent diameter is larger than the Sun's, blocking all direct sunlight, turning day into darkness. Totality occurs in a narrow path across Earth's surface, with the partial solar eclipse visible over a surrounding region thousands of kilometres wide. Totality was visible from Belgian Congo (today's DR Congo), Uganda Protectorate (today's Uganda) including the capital city Kampala, British Kenya (today's Kenya) including the capital city Nairobi, British Seychelles (today's Seychelles), and British Mauritius (today's Mauritius).
During this eclipse, comet C/1948 V1, also known as the Eclipse Comet of 1948, was discovered shining near the sun.

Related eclipses

Solar eclipses 1946–1949

Saros series 142

Inex series

Tritos series

Notes

References

1948 11 01
1948 in science
1948 11 01
November 1948 events